ELO – Total Rock Review is a Band biography DVD released in 2006 regarding the founding of Electric Light Orchestra.

The Independent biography traces the foundations of the band through its metamorphosis from The Move in 1970 and later to the point where Roy Wood quit the group leaving Jeff Lynne to steer the band in to worldwide stardom. Narrated throughout by a team of music journalists and musicians. Also included are a bonus live set filmed in 1972 originally called Granada's Set of Six and features four of the six songs, These songs are the only known live original Roy Wood ELO tracks ever filmed.

The DVD was originally released in 2005 under the title Inside the Electric Light Orchestra 1970–1973 minus the bonus live tracks.

Band Lineup

Included in the bonus live set, The original ELO touring band were filmed by Granada Television in 1972 and it is the only known footage of their debut tour line-up in existence.

Roy Wood – guitar, cello, bass, saxophone
Jeff Lynne – guitar, bass
Bev Bevan – drums
Richard Tandy – bass, piano
Bill Hunt – keyboards, horn
Hugh McDowell – cello
Mike Edwards – cello
Wilf Gibson – violin
Andy Craig – cello

Content
Main feature Critical review

Bonus Live set featuring

"Queen of the Hours"
"Jeff's Boogie No 2"
"Whisper in the Night"
"Great Balls of Fire"

Image gallery

References

Electric Light Orchestra video albums
Documentary films about rock music and musicians